Bonapruncinia is a monotypic genus of Atlantic crab spiders containing the single species, Bonapruncinia sanctaehelenae. It was first described by P. L. G. Benoit in 1977, and is found on Saint Helena.

See also
 List of Thomisidae species

References

Monotypic Araneomorphae genera
Spiders of Africa
Thomisidae